Adrian Smith (born 18 March 1964) is a former strongman competitor from Great Britain. Adrian started his strength career in bodybuilding before switching over to strongman. He was trained by the legendary Geoff Capes for the 1990 World's Strongest Man competition, his only appearance in WSM, finishing in 5th place. Adrian also competed in Pure Strength IV for team Great Britain along with teammate Brian Bell. Team Great Britain finished in 4th place. And Subbed vor charlie Van der Bosh in 1989 Pure strengh.

References

1964 births
British strength athletes
British bodybuilders
Living people